Wolfram Dörinkel (September 5, 1907 – November 26, 1975) was a German politician of the Free Democratic Party (FDP) and former member of the German Bundestag.

Life 
From 1954 until October 1, 1961 he was a member of the Hessian State Parliament. From October 10, 1957 until he left the state parliament, he was chairman of the FDP state parliament faction as successor to Oswald Adolph Kohut, and from 1958 he was also deputy chairman of the Committee for Economics and Transport.

In the 1961 federal elections, Dörinkel was elected to the German Bundestag via the state list of the FDP Hessen, of which he was a member until 1965.

Literature

References

1907 births
1975 deaths
Members of the Bundestag for Hesse
Members of the Bundestag 1961–1965
Members of the Bundestag for the Free Democratic Party (Germany)
Members of the Landtag of Hesse